Psara is a genus of moths of the family Crambidae described by Snellen in 1875.

Species
Psara acrospila (Meyrick, 1886)
Psara admensalis (Walker, 1859)
Psara aprepia (Hampson, 1913)
Psara atritermina (Hampson, 1913)
Psara bractealis (Kenrick, 1907)
Psara chathamalis (Schaus, 1923)
Psara cryptolepis (E. L. Martin, 1956)
Psara dorcalis (Guenée, 1862)
Psara dryalis (Walker, 1859)
Psara ferruginalis (Saalmüller, 1880)
Psara frenettalis Legrand, 1966
Psara glaucalis (Hampson, 1912)
Psara guatalis Schaus, 1920
Psara hesperialis (Herrich-Schäffer, 1871)
Psara ingeminata (Meyrick, 1933)
Psara intermedialis (Amsel, 1956)
Psara jasiusalis (Walker, 1859)
Psara molestalis (Amsel, 1956)
Psara mysticalis (Schaus, 1920)
Psara nigridior Rothschild, 1915
Psara normalis Hampson, 1918
Psara obscuralis (Lederer, 1863)
Psara orphnopeza J. F. G. Clarke, 1986
Psara pallicaudalis Snellen, 1875
Psara palpalis Hampson, 1918
Psara pargialis (Schaus, 1920)
Psara pertentalis (Möschler, 1890)
Psara prumnides (Druce, 1895)
Psara selenialis Snellen, 1895
Psara simillima (Hampson, 1913)
Psara subaurantialis (Herrich-Schäffer, 1871)
Psara subhyalinalis (Herrich-Schäffer, 1871)
Psara submarginalis Caradja, 1925
Psara ultratrinalis (Marion, 1954)
Psara venezuelensis (Amsel, 1956)

Former species
Psara mahensis (T. B. Fletcher, 1910)
Psara pallidalis Walker, 1859
Psara subnitalis Munroe, 1995

References

External links

Spilomelinae
Crambidae genera